Max Ferdinand (born November 4, 1986) is a Haitian footballer currently playing for the Baltimore Blast in the Major Arena Soccer League.

Career

Youth and amateur
Ferdinand grew up in Reading, Pennsylvania and attended Reading High School, but did not play college soccer. In 2009 Ferdinand played with FC Reading Revolution in the National Premier Soccer League.

Professional
In 2010, Ferdinand, then with the MASL's Baltimore Blast, was named the league's Rookie of the Year.

After trialing with Chicago Fire of Major League Soccer, Ferdinand signed with the Rochester Rhinos in 2010. He made his professional debut on May 19, 2010 in a game against Crystal Palace Baltimore, and scored his first professional outdoor goal on June 26, 2010 in a game against the Puerto Rico Islanders.

Ferdinand signed with the Baltimore Blast on September 9, 2021.

Honors

Rochester Rhinos
USSF Division 2 Pro League Regular Season Champions (1): 2010

Milwaukee Wave
 2018-19 MASL Champion
 2018-19 All-MASL First Team

References

External links
 Rochester Rhinos bio
 Baltimore Blast bio
 Reading Revolution bio
 Pointstrak stats

1986 births
Living people
Association football forwards
Baltimore Blast (2008–2014 MISL) players
Expatriate soccer players in the United States
Haitian expatriate footballers
Haitian footballers
Haitian emigrants to the United States
Rochester New York FC players
USL Championship players
USSF Division 2 Professional League players
Major Indoor Soccer League (2008–2014) players
Soccer players from Pennsylvania
Sportspeople from Reading, Pennsylvania
Major Arena Soccer League players
Milwaukee Wave players
National Premier Soccer League players
St. Louis Ambush (2013–) players